Scorching Beauty is the fifth studio album released by the American hard rock group Iron Butterfly. Released four years after their original breakup, it was recorded by a reformed lineup with only one member remaining from their previous album (drummer Ron Bushy). In addition to Bushy, this lineup includes Erik Brann, the guitarist from the classic lineup, Phil Kramer, and Howard Reitzes. The album cover was designed by Ernie Cefalu and illustrated by Drew Struzan. This album, along with Sun and Steel (released later in 1975), failed commercially. Tracks from this album tend to be ignored on Iron Butterfly compilations/greatest hit collections.

Reception

AllMusic's Stephen Thomas Erlewine called the album "undistinguished" and said that it "fell between the group's heavy acid rock and mid-'70s arena rock conventions."

Track listing

Charts

Personnel
Iron Butterfly
Erik Brann – guitars, lead vocals
Ron Bushy – drums, backing vocals
Philip Taylor Kramer – bass guitar, vocals
Howard Reitzes – keyboards, vocals
'''Guest musicianv
Jon Anderson – backing vocals on "Pearly Gates"

Singles
 "Searchin' Circles" (2:53 edit) b/w "Pearly Gates" (2:35 edit)
 "High on a Mountain Top" b/w "Before You Go"

References

Iron Butterfly albums
1974 albums
MCA Records albums
Albums with cover art by Drew Struzan